HMS Terror was an 8-gun bomb ketch launched in 1759 for the British Royal Navy that it sold in 1774. New owners renamed her Union. She made two voyages as a Greenland whaler before becoming a London-based transport. She remained a transport until she was lost on 20 May 1782 off the Malabar coast of India.

Royal Navy
Commander William Bennet commissioned Terror in January 1759 and sailed for the Mediterranean on 14 April. Commander Michael Kearny replaced Bennett in August. In April 1861 Commander St John Chinnery replaced Kearny, with Terror still serving in the Mediterranean. She was converted to a sloop in 1761 and then back to a bomb in 1762. she was paid-off in March 1763. She then underwent repairs but apparently was not recommissioned.

Disposal: Terror was sold on 9 August 1774 at Deptford for £665.

Mercantile service
In the 1775 and 1776 whaling seasons, Union was engaged in the British northern whale fishery. On 12 June 1775 Union was at Greenland with two "fish".

On 2 August 1776 Union, Hudson, master, arrived at Gravesend from Greenland with four fish and 50 seals.

Union first appeared in online issues of Lloyd's Register (LR) in the issue for 1776.

Fate
Lloyd's List reported on 8 July 1783 that the transports Union and Prudence had been lost near Tellicherry. The entry for Union in the volume for LR for 1783 bore the annotation "Lost".

The wrecking occurred on 20 May 1782. Union and Prudence were serving as ordnance store ships when a storm drove them from Calicut roads. They were unable to clear Cotta Point and wrecked on the reefs there.

Citations and references
Citations

References
 
 
 

1759 ships
Bomb vessels of the Royal Navy
Ships built in England
Age of Sail merchant ships of England
Whaling ships
Maritime incidents in 1782